Tenjiku shogi (天竺将棋 tenjiku shōgi, "Indian chess" or 天竺大将棋 tenjiku dai shōgi "great Indian chess") is a large-board variant of shogi (Japanese chess).  The game dates back to the 15th or 16th century and was based on the earlier chu shogi, which itself was based on dai shogi.

Because of the terse and often incomplete wording of the historical sources for the large shogi variants, except for chu shogi and to a lesser extent dai shogi (which were at some points of time the most prestigious forms of shogi being played), the historical rules of tenjiku shogi are not clear. Different sources often differ significantly in the moves attributed to the pieces. The descriptions listed here are a likely reconstruction based on chu shogi, the primary basis of tenjiku shogi, but not all contemporary players follow these historically-based rules. It is not clear if the game was ever played much historically, as there is no record of sets ever having been made.

Rules of the game

Objective 

The objective of the game is to capture the opponent's king and, if present, the prince, which counts as a second king.  Unlike standard shogi, captured pieces may not be dropped back into play by the capturing player.

Game equipment 

Two players, Black and White (or 先手 sente and 後手 gote), play on a board composed of squares in a grid of 16 ranks (rows) by 16 files (columns) with a total of 256 squares.  The squares are undifferentiated by marking or color. A pair of dots may be placed just beyond the fifth rank on each side to mark the promotion zones and aid in the initial setup of the two camps.

Each player has a set of 78 wedge-shaped pieces of 36 types.  In all, the players must remember 43 moves for these pieces.  The pieces are of slightly different sizes. From largest to smallest (roughly most to least powerful) they are:

 1 King
 1 Great general
 1 Vice general
 2 Rook generals
 2 Bishop generals
 1 Free eagle
 1 Queen
 2 Soaring eagles
 2 Horned falcons
 2 Water buffalos
 4 Chariot soldiers
 2 Fire demons
 1 Lion hawk
 1 Lion
 2 Dragon kings
 2 Dragon horses
 2 Rooks
 2 Bishops
 1 Kirin
 1 Phoenix
 1 Drunken elephant
 2 Blind tigers
 2 Ferocious leopards
 2 Gold generals
 2 Silver generals
 2 Copper generals
 2 Vertical movers
 2 Side movers
 2 Reverse chariots
 2 Vertical soldiers
 2 Side soldiers
 2 Lances
 2 Knights
 2 Iron generals
 2 Dogs
 16 Pawns

Several of the English names were chosen to correspond to rough equivalents in Western chess, rather than as translations of the Japanese names. The queen is sometimes referred to as the free king, a direct translation of its Japanese name. The kirin's name is sometimes anglicised as kylin.

Each piece has its name in the form of one or two kanji written on its face. On the reverse side of some pieces are two or three other characters, often in a different color such as red; this reverse side is turned up to indicate that the piece has been promoted during play. The pieces of the two sides do not differ in color, but instead each piece is shaped like a wedge, and faces forward, toward the opposing side. This shows who controls the piece during play.

Table of pieces

Listed below are the pieces of the game and, if they promote, which pieces they promote to. Pieces marked with an *asterisk are only available with promotion.

(The queen could also be abbreviated FK for free king, and the kirin as Ky for kylin.)

The promotions can be summarized as series of promotion chains, as follows. Within each block below, a piece (except the kings) promotes to the piece above it. Pieces at the top of each block do not promote (and if in italics, and with an *asterisk, as stated before, these appear only upon promotion). Note that pieces may only promote once. For example, a gold general promotes to a rook, and a rook promotes to a dragon king, but a gold general promoted to a rook cannot promote a second time to a dragon king. This is clear from the equipment, for each piece only has two sides.

The pieces with a pink background do not appear in chu shogi. Of the chu shogi pieces, only the go-between (which promotes to drunk elephant) does not appear in tenjiku shogi, being replaced by the dog in its function of being a piece in front of the pawn line. The knight and iron general appear in dai shogi, but there they promote to gold general.

Setup 

The initial setup of the board is as follows. See below for a description of the types of moves involved.

Full names 

Abbreviated names

Game play 

Two players alternate making a move, with Black moving first. (The pieces are not differentiated by color; the traditional chess terms "Black" and "White" are only used to indicate who plays first, and to differentiate the sides during discussions of the game.) A move consists of moving a piece either to an empty square on the board or to a square occupied by an opposing piece, thus capturing that piece; and optionally of promoting the moving piece, if the move enters the promotion zone (that is, it starts outside the promotion zone and ends inside it), or if it is a capture and any part of it is in the promotion zone. Each of these options is detailed below.

Despite the large size of the board and number of pieces, tenjiku shogi games are often quicker than smaller shogi variants because of the higher average power of the pieces.  Good use of the fire demons can make for a short game.

Movement and capture 

Tenjiku shogi pieces that occur in chu shogi or dai shogi move as they do in that game, but the pieces from dai shogi promote differently.

An opposing piece is captured by displacement: That is, if a piece moves to a square occupied by an opposing piece, the opposing piece is displaced and removed from the board. A piece cannot move to a square occupied by a friendly piece, that is, by another piece controlled by the moving player. The one exception to this is the unique burn of the fire demon.

Each piece on the game moves in a characteristic pattern. Pieces move either orthogonally (that is, forward, backward, left, or right, in the direction of one of the arms of a plus sign, +), or diagonally (in the direction of one of the arms of a multiplication sign, ×). The vice general, fire demon, lion hawk, lion, and knight are exceptions, in that they do not move, or are not required to move, in a straight line.

Many pieces are capable of several kinds of movement, with the type of movement most often depending on the direction. The movement categories are:

Step movers and limited range movers

Some pieces are limited to moving one square at a time. If a friendly piece occupies an adjacent square, the moving piece may not move in that direction; if an opposing piece is there, it may be displaced and captured.

The step movers are the king, drunk elephant, blind tiger, ferocious leopard, gold general, silver general, copper general, iron general, dog, and pawn. Other pieces may step in certain directions, but move differently in other directions.

Other pieces have a limited range of two squares along a straight line. The water buffalo, chariot soldier, vertical soldier, and side soldier may move one or two squares in certain directions. They can only move to the second square if the first is unoccupied. They may capture on either square, but must stop where they capture.

Area movers

The lion, lion hawk, vice general, and fire demon may take multiple (2 to 3) steps in a single turn. These do not have to be in a line, so these pieces can potentially reach every square within two or three steps of the starting square, not just squares along one of the diagonals or orthogonals. Such moves are also useful to get around obstructions. An area mover must stop where it captures.

Jumping pieces

Some pieces can jump, or in the case of the knight can only jump: They pass over an intervening piece, whether friend or foe, with no effect on either. These are the free eagle, lion hawk, lion, soaring eagle, horned falcon, tetrarch, kirin, phoenix, and knight. These jumps all have a range of two squares: that is, the first square is passed over, and the piece lands (and captures) on the second. The knight jumps between the diagonals and orthogonals, and the lion and lion hawk may do so.

Ranging pieces

Many pieces can move any number of empty squares along a straight orthogonal or diagonal line, limited only by the edge of the board. If an opposing piece intervenes, it may be captured by moving to that square and removing it from the board. A ranging piece must stop where it captures, and cannot bypass a piece that is in its way. If a friendly piece intervenes, the moving piece is limited to a distance that stops short of the intervening piece; if the friendly piece is adjacent, it cannot move in that direction at all.

The ranging pieces are the great general, vice general, rook general, bishop general, free eagle, soaring eagle, horned falcon, queen, water buffalo, chariot soldier, fire demon, lion hawk, dragon king, dragon horse, rook, bishop, vertical mover, side mover, reverse chariot, vertical soldier, side soldier and lance.

Range jumping pieces

A few powerful pieces may jump over any number of pieces (including zero), friend or foe, along a diagonal or orthogonal, but only when making a capture. These are the great general, vice general, rook general, and bishop general.

However, they may only jump over other pieces of lower rank, whether friend or foe. None may jump a king or prince of either side. The relevant ranking is:
King, prince
Great general
Vice general
Rook general, bishop general

That is, bishop and rook generals cannot jump over any other range-jumping piece.

The range jumpers can nevertheless capture each other, even if they cannot jump over each other and there are other pieces outside the ranking in the way. (For example, though a rook general cannot jump over an enemy great general, it may still capture the great general.) They cannot capture a king or prince by jumping, but can do so without jumping.

Some descriptions of the game do not limit this ability to moves making a capture. However, most mention that these pieces have two types of move, ranging and range jumping, suggesting that the capture rule may have been mistakenly omitted.

Multiple captures

The lion, lion hawk, soaring eagle and horned falcon have sequential multiple-capture abilities, called "lion moves". The fire demon can "burn" multiple pieces simultaneously. These unusual moves are described below.

Other

The heavenly tetrarch cannot move to an adjacent square, and has other idiosyncrasies; the fire demon 'burns' adjacent pieces. This is best described below.

Repeated board positions

A player is not allowed to make a move that would return the board to a previous position, with the same player to move. This rule prevents games from entering into a repeated loop.

However, evidence from chu shogi problems suggests that this at least does not apply to a player who is in check or whose pieces are attacked, as otherwise one could win via perpetual check or perpetual pursuit. The modern chu shogi rule as applied by the Japanese Chu Shogi Association (JCSA) is as follows, and presumably tenjiku shogi should be similar. If one side is making attacks on other pieces (however futile) with his moves in the repeat cycle, and the other is not, the attacking side must deviate, while in case of checking the checker must deviate regardless of whether the checked side attacks other pieces. In the case of consecutive passes, the side passing first must deviate, making turn passing to avoid zugzwang pointless if the opponent is in a position where he can pass his turn too. If none of these are applicable, repetition is a draw.

Promotion 

Tenjiku shogi pieces that occur in chu shogi promote as they do in that game, with the exceptions of the lion and queen, which do not promote in chu shogi.

A player's promotion zone consists of the five far ranks, at the original line of the opponent's pawns and beyond. When a promotable piece makes a move entering the promotion zone, or makes a capture within the promotion zone—including captures entering, leaving, or entirely within the zone—it has the option of "promoting" to a more powerful rank.

The historical sources do not provide guidance on whether pieces which take multiple steps per move are allowed to promote by crossing into the promotion zone and back out again. Chu shogi does not offer guidance here either, because such pieces do not promote in chu shogi. The Chess Variant Pages adopt the stipulation that a move allows promotion if and only if:
 It starts outside and ends inside the promotion zone, or:
 It is a capture and starts inside the promotion zone.

By this rule, igui or capturing does not allow promotion if the move begins and ends outside the promotion zone, even if it passes in and back out along the way.

Promotion is effected by turning the piece over after it moves, revealing the name of its promoted rank. As such, a promoted piece cannot then promote a second time. Promotion is never mandatory, and in some cases it may be beneficial to leave the piece unpromoted. Promotion is permanent and promoted pieces may not revert to their original rank.

Promoting a piece has the effect of changing how that piece moves. See above for what each piece promotes to and below for how they move.

The king, great general, vice general, free eagle, lion hawk, and fire demon do not promote, nor can already promoted pieces promote further.

If a piece is not promoted upon entering the promotion zone, then it may only promote if it makes a capture. This is reset by leaving the zone and reentering: promotion is possible on such a reentry even without a capture.

If a piece which cannot retreat or move to the side advances to the far rank, so that it would otherwise have no further legal move, it is trapped. These pieces are the pawn, knight, iron general, and lance. In practice this would never occur for pawns or lances, which promote to pieces which keep their old moves, so that there is never any reason to defer their promotion, as stalemate is a loss for the stalemated player.

The situation for the knight and iron general, which promote to pieces that do not keep their old moves, is unclear. Since there could be a reason to defer their promotion, it is possible that they receive a second chance to promote at the far rank on a non-capture, as in chu shogi. (In chu shogi, this provision applies to pawns, which are not completely upward compatible with the gold generals they promote to because of the rules against trading lions.) This second chance, if it exists, could likewise be declined, leaving the knight or iron general as an immobile "dead piece" (死に駒). However, this is uncertain, because it is not clear when the rule of pawn promotion was added to chu shogi (before or after the invention of tenjiku shogi), and because the Edo-era sources have numerous lacunae in the rules for the variants other than  sho shogi and chu shogi.

Movement diagrams
In the diagrams below, the different types of moves are coded by symbol and by color: blue for step moves, green for multiple capture, red for range moves, yellow for jumps, and orange for ranging jumps.

Individual pieces

Pieces are arranged in this section so that, if they promote, they promote into the piece above them. Piece names with a grey background are present at the start of the game; those with a blue background only appear with promotion. Betza's funny notation has been included in brackets for easier reference, with the extension that the notation xxxayyyK stands for an xxxK move possibly followed by an yyyK move, not necessarily in the same direction. Larger numbers of 'legs' can be indicated by repeated application of 'a', or by numbers: thus a3K means a piece that can take up to three steps of a king. By default continuation legs can go into all directions, but can be restricted to a single line by a modifier 'v' ("vertical", interpreted relative to the piece's current position on its path). The default modality of all legs is the ability to move and capture: other possibilities are specified explicitly. Thus mKa3K means a piece that takes up to three steps of a king, but must stop when it first captures. Square brackets are used to make it clear what legs the a modifier chains together: thus DaK would denote a dabbaba move followed by a king move, but D[aK] would denote a piece that can move as a dabbaba, or twice as a king.

Another extension is that inequalities can be used in place of numbers denoting range: thus, while R4 is a piece that moves like a rook, but only up to four squares, R(2≤n≤4) is a piece that moves like a rook, but only two, three, or four squares. Further, pn refers to cannon-like pieces that can jump at most n pieces along their path, and pp means the same as p∞ (just as WW is synonymous with W∞, both meaning a rook). Finally, x stands for "shooting": the xK for instance can pass its turn (shooting empty squares), or it can shoot (capture) any adjacent enemy piece without moving.

Repetition 
A player may not make a move if the resulting position is one that has previously occurred in the game with the same player to move. This is called repetition (千日手 sennichite). Note that certain pieces have the ability to pass in certain situations (lions, soaring eagles, horned falcons, vice generals, fire demons, free eagles, and lion hawks). Such a pass move leaves the position unchanged, but it does not violate the repetition rule, as it will now be the turn of the other player to move. Of course, two consecutive passes are not possible, as the first player will see the same position as before.

However, evidence from chu shogi problems suggests that this at least does not apply to a player who is in check or whose pieces are attacked, as otherwise one could win via perpetual check or perpetual pursuit. The modern chu shogi rule as applied by the Japanese Chu Shogi Association (JCSA) is as follows, and presumably tenjiku shogi should be similar. If one side is making attacks on other pieces (however futile) with his moves in the repeat cycle, and the other is not, the attacking side must deviate, while in case of checking the checker must deviate regardless of whether the checked side attacks other pieces. In the case of consecutive passes, the side passing first must deviate, making turn passing to avoid zugzwang pointless if the opponent is in a position where he can pass his turn too. Only the fourth repetition is forbidden by these rules. If none of these are applicable, repetition is a draw.

Check and mate 

When a player makes a move, such that the opponent's only remaining king or prince could be captured on the following move, the move is said to give check; the king or prince is said to be in check. If a player's last king or prince is in check and no legal move by that player will get it out of check, the checking move is also mate, and effectively wins the game.

Unlike Western chess, a player need not move out of check in tenjiku shogi, and indeed may even move into check. Although obviously not often a good idea, a player with more than one royal may occasionally sacrifice one of these pieces as part of a gambit.

Game end 

A player who captures the opponent's sole remaining king or prince wins the game. This would presumably imply that checkmate and stalemate both lead to wins for the checkmating or stalemating player.

In practice these winning conditions are rarely fulfilled, as a player will typically resign when checkmated, as otherwise when loss is inevitable.

A player who makes an illegal move loses immediately. (This rule may be relaxed in casual games.)

Handicaps 

Games between players of disparate strength may be played with handicaps, by analogy with chu shogi. In a handicap game, one or more of White's pieces is removed before the start of play, and White plays the first move of the game. (As the first move can cancel out weak handicaps, either the weaker player or the stronger can be White, as needed.) However, no historical handicap system is known, unlike for chu shogi.

Game notation 

The method used in English-language texts to express shogi moves was established by George Hodges in 1976. It is derived from the algebraic notation used for chess, but modifications have been made for tenjiku shogi.

A typical example is P-8g.
The first letter represents the piece moved (see above).
Promoted pieces have a + added in front of the letter. e.g., +P for a promoted pawn.  The designation of the piece is followed by a symbol indicating the type of move: - for an ordinary move or x for a capture.  Next is the designation for the square on which the piece lands.  This consists of a number representing the file and a lowercase letter representing the rank, with 1a being the top right corner (as seen from Black's point of view) and 16p being the bottom left corner.  (This method of designating squares is based on Japanese convention, which, however, uses Japanese numerals instead of letters. For example, the square 2c is denoted by 2三 in Japanese.)

If a lion, horned falcon, soaring eagle or Heavenly Tetrarch captures by igui, or the fire demon burns, the square of the piece being captured is used instead of the destination square, and this is preceded by the symbol !.  A piece moving next to a fire demon (suicide move) is followed by a *.  If a double or triple capture is made, than subsequent captures are added after the first capture.

If a move entitles the player to promote the piece, then a + is added to the end to signify that the promotion was taken, or an = to indicate that it was declined.
For example, Nx7d= indicates a knight capturing on 7d without promoting.

In cases where the above notation would be ambiguous, the designation of the start square is added after the designation for the piece in order to make clear which piece is meant.

Moves are commonly numbered as in chess.

In handicap games White plays first, so Black's move 1 is replaced by an ellipsis.

Notes on disputed moves
In general, the presentation of the rules above follows The Chess Variant Pages, except for whether or not the water buffalo can immediately burn enemy pieces upon promotion.

Lion hawk
The Shogi Association (TSA) rules, for unknown reasons, interpreted "like a lion" to mean that the lion hawk did not have the full lion powers of jump and double capture, but only a two-step area move. This interpretation was never made in Japanese articles on tenjiku shogi, and has largely been abandoned in the West as well. Giving the lion hawk full lion powers brings the piece into line with the rest of the game, and is the only interpretation supported by the historical sources.

Free eagle
Western sources give the free eagle the move of a queen plus the ability to jump to the second square along an orthogonal. This however seems unlikely, given that such a move could be more easily expressed as "moves as queen or kirin".

Japanese Wikipedia states 斜めの場合は飛び越えては行けないが、縦横の場合は駒を飛び越えて行ける "it cannot jump on the diagonals, but can jump pieces on the orthogonals." The diagram shows an orthogonal range jump, but the free eagle does not appear in the ranking list of range-jumping pieces.

However, the Edo-era Sho Shōgi Zushiki states that it moves 如奔王亦猫刄再度歩兼二行 "as a queen or two times as a cat sword in two directions", which could be taken as requiring the piece to finish on one of the orthogonals, if not exactly a jump; while elsewhere in the Sho Shōgi Zushiki and in the Shōgi Zushiki it says that 奔王の動きに加えて、猫刄の動き（斜め四方向に1マス動く）を2度できる "in addition to moving as a queen, it can make a cat-sword move (one square in one of the four diagonals) twice", which has no such implication, but which Japanese Wikipedia says is thought to mean a jump. This creates a symmetry between the free eagle and lion hawk: the lion hawk is a lion combined with the diagonal moves of the queen, while the free eagle is a queen combined with the diagonal moves of the lion.

Fire demon
TSA rules state that if you move your fire demon next to an opposing fire demon, only your fire demon is immolated; all other adjacent pieces survive. This implies that a fire demon's passive burn (how it automatically burns enemy pieces that end up next to it without moving) is faster than its active burn (how it burns enemy pieces that it moves next to). A few computer programs and books stipulate that other adjacent pieces are immolated as well, with only the opposing fire demon surviving, but this interpretation is not widely followed. Both variants are playable, though the TSA rules are more consistent in not allowing the suicidal fire demon to burn anything at all.

Japanese Wikipedia states only that 火鬼が火鬼の隣に移動したときは、動いた方が焼かれる "When a fire demon moves next to a fire demon, the moving piece is burnt," without mentioning the fate of surrounding pieces (thus perhaps implying that nothing special happens to them).

The two Edo-era sources have the orthogonal ranging move along the rank of the board. Western sources have it move along the file, but moving along the rank (as used in this article) would be more in keeping with the fire demon being a promoted water buffalo.

The fire demon's passive burn suggests that all adjacent enemy pieces burn when the water buffalo promotes, as otherwise that would be the only way a piece could ever stay next to an enemy fire demon.

Heavenly tetrarch
Western sources do not have the ranging move along the orthogonal. However, the Sho Shōgi Zushiki states it moves 如車兵亦近八方不行其外周二三要用歩 "as a chariot soldier, also the eight neighboring squares without moving and taking two or three steps outside the periphery", and this is consistent with it being a promoted chariot soldier.

However, the two Edo-era sources do not state that the heavenly tetrarch can perform igui, even though igui is explicitly stated for the pieces that incontrovertibly have that power. George Hodges (TSA) appears to have taken the igui power from a "Kyoto source" that currently cannot be located.

Range-jumping generals
TSA rules state that the range-jumping generals cannot capture an equal or higher-ranking piece, not just that they cannot jump over them. This gives a huge advantage to Black, so that Black can win every game if played right, but is not supported by Japanese articles on tenjiku shogi and has been largely abandoned in the West as unplayable. This is due to the very terse wording of the historical documents, that do not make it clear if the capture of an equal or higher-ranking piece is allowed even if such a piece cannot be jumped over. The presence of the king in the hierarchy suggested the TSA rules, since the king cannot jump-capture at all, and in any situation where the enemy king could be jumped over it would not happen in practice as it would simply be captured. Due to the resulting playability problem, it was suggested that capturing would be allowed but not jumping, but this allowed for smothered mates in the opening and again gives a huge advantage to Black. However, the rule used in this article and The Chess Variant Pages, which allows the capture of equal or higher-ranking pieces except kings or princes, removes this advantage to Black.

Strategy

Piece values 
According to the German Chu Shogi Association, the average values of the pieces are (using the interpretations of the English-language sources):

These average values do not take into account the special status of the king and prince as royal pieces. They have also been normalized so that the pawn is worth 1 point to avoid fractions. Additionally, pieces gain in value if they have a good chance of promotion (particularly for the water buffalo, which promotes to the most powerful piece in the game), and the jumping generals and fire demon tend to lose some power as the board empties (because they then cannot make full use of their jumping and burning abilities).

See also 
 Shogi variant
 Wa shogi
 Chu shogi
 Heian dai shogi
 Dai shogi
 Dai dai shogi
 Maka dai dai shogi
 Tai shogi
 Taikyoku shogi

References

External links 
 Tenjiku Shogi at The Chess Variant Pages
 Shogi Net
 CP Adams's book on tenjiku tactics
 CP Adams's Tenjiku shogi wiki
 Gamerz.net/tenjiku shogi
 History.chess/tenjiku shogi
 Tenjiku shogi games and problems
 Tenjiku Shogi, the wild Chess game (by H. G. Muller)

Shogi variants